The Middle Arctic tundra ecoregion (WWF ID: NA1115) covers a broad stretch of northern Canada - the southern islands of the Arctic Archipelago, plus the northern mainland of Nunavut and, across Hudson Bay to the east, a portion of northern Quebec.  This is the coldest and driest ecoregion in Canada, and can be referred to as a 'polar desert'.  It is an important region for breeding and migratory birds, and supports 80% of the world's muskox.

Location and description 
Most of the territory rolling lowlands (mean elevation is ).

The ecoregion to the north is the 'High Arctic tundra' (colder and wetter), to the south is the Low Arctic tundra (warmer and wetter).  The bedrock under the western extent is Paleozoic and Mesozoic sedimentary rock with a relatively flat cover of glacial moraines and marine deposits.  The eastern bedrock is older Precambrian granite, with rockier topography.  Permafrost is continuous under the whole region, with depths up to hundreds of meters.  The northern islands are surrounded by pack ice most of the year.

Climate 
Average annual precipitation is low, from 100-200 mm/year. Snow covers the ground for 10 months each year.

Flora and fauna 
The middle arctic tundra is north of the treeline.  56% of the ground cover is moss and lichen, 30% is low herbaceous vegetation tolerant of the cold and dry environment, 1% is herbaceous wetlands, and up to 1% supports shrubs in protected areas.  Because of the harsh conditions—the cold, aridity, wind and poor, thin soils—vegetation is sparse and stunted.  The rare protected area for shrubs is characterized by arctic willow (Salix arctica) and dwarf birch (Betula) and alder (Alnus); the herb cover by Saxifraga species and Dryas).

Characteristic mammals include barren-ground caribou (Rangifer tarandus ssp. arcticus), muskox (Ovibos moschatus), wolf (Canis lupus), arctic fox (Alopex lagopus), polar bear (Ursus maritimus, arctic hare (Lepus arcticus, brown lemming (Lemmus sibiricus) and collared lemming (Dicrostonyx groenlandicus).  The region supports up to 80% of the world's musk ox (Ovibos moschatus).

The region supports important breeding and migratory grounds for birds, including snow goose (Chen caerulescens), brant (Branta bernicla), Canada goose (Branta canadensis), eider (Somateria spp.) and oldsquaw duck (Clangula hyemalis).

Protected areas 
Over 5% of the ecoregion is officially protected.  These protected areas include:
 Aulavik National Park
 East Bay Migratory Bird Sanctuary
 Auyuittuq National Park
 Katannilik Territorial Park Reserve

See also
List of ecoregions in Canada (WWF)

References

External links

Nearctic ecoregions
Ecoregions of Canada
Tundra ecoregions